Joe McGhie may refer to:
 Joe McGhie (Australian footballer) (born 1947), Australian rules footballer
 Joe McGhie (footballer, born 1884) (1884–1976), Scottish footballer